Bugs in Love is a Silly Symphonies animated Disney short film. It was released in 1932, and was the final Symphony to be shot with black-and-white film.

Plot
A carnival is made by insects out of garbage. The carnival includes a Ferris wheel made out of a bike tire and pedals, a "slide" made out of a pipe, and a record player "merry-go-round".

Two love bugs are skating on a broken mirror when the female bug leaves to her house to freshen up. The male bug follows her.

While the two are courting, a crow flies by and spots the two bugs. Licking his lips, he sneaks closer to them. He starts chasing after the two bugs. The crow scares the male bug into a glass bottle and puts a cork on the bottle. The female bug runs into her home. The crow follows her, and chases her around the room while she tries to hide.

Meanwhile, the male bug escapes from the bottle he was trapped in and runs to save his lover. The male bug begins to fight the crow when another bug sees the battle. He warns all the other bugs at the carnival about the crow. The bugs stop what they are doing and together defeat the crow and save the couple.

Comic adaptations
The Silly Symphony comic strip began on January 10, 1932 with a storyline about Bucky Bug, an original character inspired by Bugs in Love. Bucky starred in the Silly Symphony strip until March 4, 1934.

In 1943, the anthology comic book Walt Disney's Comics and Stories began publishing original full-length comic book stories, and the first new 10-page Bucky Bug story appeared in issue #39 (December 1943) -- "A Cure for Gout," by Al Taliaferro. Bucky's stories appeared monthly for the next six years, ending with issue #120 (September 1950). The stories were drawn by a number of artists, including Carl Buettner, Vivie Risto, Ralph Heimdahl and Tony Strobl.

Home media
The short was released on December 19, 2006 on Walt Disney Treasures: More Silly Symphonies, Volume Two.

References

External links
 
 

1932 films
1932 short films
1930s Disney animated short films
Silly Symphonies
Animated films about insects
Animated films without speech
1932 animated films
Films directed by Burt Gillett
Films produced by Walt Disney
Films scored by Frank Churchill
American black-and-white films
Films based on American comics
1930s American films